Zhelad Saddle (‘Sedlovina Zhelad’ \se-dlo-vi-'na 'zhe-l&d\ is the ice-covered saddle of elevation 962 m extending 350 m in the west foothills of Detroit Plateau on Danco Coast in Graham Land, Antarctica.  It connects the northwest slopes of Razhana Buttress to Sonketa Ridge, and is part of the glacial divide between Sikorsky Glacier to the north and Trepetlika Glacier to the southwest.

The saddle is named after the settlement of Zhelad in Northeastern Bulgaria.

Location
British mapping in 1978.

Maps
British Antarctic Territory. Scale 1:200000 topographic map. DOS 610 Series, Sheet W 64 60. Directorate of Overseas Surveys, Tolworth, UK, 1978.
 Antarctic Digital Database (ADD). Scale 1:250000 topographic map of Antarctica. Scientific Committee on Antarctic Research (SCAR). Since 1993, regularly upgraded and updated.

Notes

References
 Bulgarian Antarctic Gazetteer. Antarctic Place-names Commission. (details in Bulgarian, basic data in English)
 Zhelad Saddle. SCAR Composite Gazetteer of Antarctica

External links
 Zhelad Saddle. Copernix satellite image

Mountain passes of Graham Land
Bulgaria and the Antarctic
Danco Coast